Charaxes phenix is a butterfly in the family Nymphalidae. It is found in Tanzania.
Holotype  in Muséum national d'histoire naturelle.

Subspecies
Charaxes phenix phenix (Tanzania: Nguu Mountains)
Charaxes phenix daniellae White, 1996  (Tanzania: Uzungwa Range)

References

External links
 Charaxes phenix images at Consortium for the Barcode of Life

Butterflies described in 1993
phenix
Endemic fauna of Tanzania
Butterflies of Africa